John Lewis Harvey (born December 28, 1966) is a former National Football League running back who played one season with the Tampa Bay Buccaneers.

Career
Harvey attended Spring Valley High School in Spring Valley, New York. Harvey currently holds three school records, Most Career Rushing Yards, with 3,118, Most Rushing Yards in a Season with 1,587 and Most Rushing touchdowns in a game with 6. After graduating in 1984, Harvey went to college at the University of Texas at El Paso. After his time at UTEP, Harvey was signed as an undrafted free agent with the Tampa Bay Buccaneers, serving as a running back and kickoff returner during the 1990 season. He scored one touchdown during the 1990 season.

Criminal charges
In 2008, Harvey was accused of raping a 12-year-old girl, and pled guilty to first-degree rape and a misdemeanor count of endangering the welfare of a child. He was sentenced to 12 years in prison.

References and sources

1966 births
Living people
Players of American football from New York (state)
African-American players of American football
American football running backs
Prisoners and detainees of New York (state)
Tampa Bay Buccaneers players
UTEP Miners football players
People from Spring Valley, New York
21st-century African-American people
20th-century African-American sportspeople